Shotgun Blossom is the debut album by New Zealand indie rock group Snapper. It was released via Avalanche Records.

Critical reception
AllMusic wrote that "[Peter] Gutteridge and Dominic Stones' guitar work balanced between minimal obsessiveness and brawling, massive soloing, the latter kept as part of the mix instead of the standout element ('Eyes That Shine' is a perfect example of this, with its snarl/buzzsaw opening notes and almost liquid melodies flowing through the noise)." The Guardian called the album "harsh and hard and droning and unrelenting."

Track listing
"Pop Your Top"
"Can"
"Telepod Fly"
"Eyes That Shine"
"Dead Pictures"
"What Are You Thinking"
"Hot Sun"
"I Don't Know"
"Emmanuelle"
"Dry Spot"
"Rain"

Personnel
Snapper
Alan Haig – drums
Dominic Stones – guitar
Peter Gutteridge – guitar, keyboards, vocals, production
Christine Voice – keyboards, vocals, artwork

Additional personnel
Brent McLachlan – engineering, production

References

Snapper (band) albums
1990 albums
Flying Nun Records albums
Dunedin Sound albums